Stephen S. Gottlieb (June 4, 1936 – October 20, 2013) was an American politician who served in the New York State Assembly from the 71st district from 1969 to 1972.

He died of heart failure on October 20, 2013, at age 77.

References

1936 births
2013 deaths
Democratic Party members of the New York State Assembly